Raimon may refer to:

People

Companies

Spanish masculine given names